Chun-King is an album by American jazz pianist Bobby Timmons recorded in 1964 and released on the Prestige label.

Reception
The Allmusic review by Jason Ankeny awarded the album 4 stars calling it "an intimate, soulful session that spotlights the range and command of all involved".

Track listing
All compositions by Bobby Timmons except where noted.
 "Chun-King" (Keter Betts, Charlie Byrd) – 6:36
 "Walking Death" – 6:07
 "O Grande Amor" (Vinicius de Moraes, Antonio Carlos Jobim) – 6:55
 "Gettin' It Togetha'" – 6:50
 "I Could Have Danced All Night" (Alan Jay Lerner, Frederick Loewe) – 6:24
 "Someone to Watch Over Me" (George Gershwin, Ira Gershwin) – 4:17

Personnel
Bobby Timmons – piano
Keter Betts – bass
Albert Heath – drums

References

Prestige Records albums
Bobby Timmons albums
1964 albums
Albums recorded at Van Gelder Studio
Albums produced by Ozzie Cadena